NGC 3041 is an intermediate barred spiral galaxy located in the constellation Leo. It is categorized as SAB(rs)c in the galaxy morphological classification scheme. It was discovered by William Herschel on 23 March 1784. The galaxy is approximately 77 million light years away from earth.

See also 
 List of NGC objects (3001–4000)
 List of NGC objects
 List of spiral galaxies

References

External links 
 

Intermediate spiral galaxies
Leo (constellation)
3041
5303
28485